Laterza (or) is a town and comune in the province of Taranto, part of the Apulia region of southeast Italy.

The Gravina di Laterza, a deep gorge, starts at the southeast edge of the town.

See also

 Laterza culture
 Maiolica di Laterza
 Pane di Laterza

References

Cities and towns in Apulia